

Lao may refer to:

Laos
 Something of, from, or related to Laos, a country in Southeast Asia 
 Lao people (people from Laos, or of Lao descent)
 The Lao language
 Lao script, the writing system used to write the Lao language
 Lao (Unicode block), a block of Lao characters in Unicode
 LAO, the international vehicle registration code for Laos

Other places
 Mount Lao, Qingdao, China
 Lao River, Italy, a river of southern Italy
 Lao River, Thailand, a tributary of the Kok River in Thailand
 Lao, Bhutan
 Lao, Estonia, village in Tõstamaa Parish, Pärnu County
 Lao, Togo
 LAO, IATA code of Laoag International Airport in the Philippines

Philosophers 

 Laozi or Lao-Tzu, philosopher and poet of ancient China.

Other
 Alternative spelling of Liu, common Chinese surname
 Linear alpha olefin
 California Legislative Analyst's Office
 Legal Aid Ontario
 Legislative Affairs Office
 The material lanthanum aluminate, or LaAlO3

See also
 Loa (disambiguation)

Language and nationality disambiguation pages